

io

iob-iod
iobenguane (131 I) (INN)
iobenzamic acid (INN)
iobitridol (INN)
iobutoic acid (INN)
iocarmic acid (INN)
iocetamic acid (INN)
iodamide (INN)
iodecimol (INN)
iodetryl (INN)
iodinated (125 I) human serum albumin (INN)
iodinated (131 I) human serum albumin (INN)
iodine (124 I) girentuximab (INN)
iodine povacrylex (USAN)
iodixanol (INN)
iodocetilic acid (123 I) (INN)
iodocholesterol (131 I) (INN)
iodofiltic acid (123 I) (USAN, INN)
iodophthalein sodium (INN)
iodothiouracil (INN)
Iodotope
iodoxamic acid (INN)

iof-iom
iofendylate (INN)
iofetamine (123 I) (INN)
ioflupane (123 I) (INN)
iofratol (INN)
ioglicic acid (INN)
ioglucol (INN)
ioglucomide (INN)
ioglunide (INN)
ioglycamic acid (INN)
iohexol (INN)
iolidonic acid (INN)
iolixanic acid (INN)
iolopride (123 I) (INN)
iomazenil (123 I) (INN)
iomeglamic acid (INN)
iomeprol irtemazole (INN)
iometin (125 I) (INN)
iometin (131 I) (INN)
iometopane (123 I) (INN)
iomorinic acid (INN)

ion-ios
Ionamin
ioncanlidic acid (123 I) (INN)
Ionosol
Iontocaine
iopamidol (INN)
iopanoic acid (INN)
iopentol (INN)
iophenoic acid (INN)
Iopidine
ioprocemic acid (INN)
iopromide (INN)
iopronic acid (INN)
iopydol (INN)
iopydone (INN)
iosarcol (INN)
Iosat
iosefamic acid (INN)
ioseric acid (INN)
iosimenol (USAN)
iosimide (INN)
iosulamide (INN)
iosumetic acid (INN)

iot-ioz
iotalamic acid (INN)
iotasul (INN)
iotetric acid (INN)
iotranic acid (INN)
iotriside (INN)
iotrizoic acid (INN)
iotrolan (INN)
iotroxic acid (INN)
ioversol (INN)
ioxabrolic acid (INN)
ioxaglic acid (INN)
ioxilan (INN)
ioxitalamic acid (INN)
ioxotrizoic acid (INN)
iozomic acid (INN)

ip
ipamorelin (INN)
ipazilide (INN)
ipenoxazone (INN)
ipexidine (INN)
ipidacrine (INN)
ipilimumab (INN)
ipragliflozin (INN)
ipragratine (INN)
ipramidil (INN)
ipratropium bromide (INN)
iprazochrome (INN)
ipriflavone (INN)
iprindole (INN)
Iprivask
iproclozide (INN)
iprocrolol (INN)
iproheptine (INN)
iproniazid (INN)
ipronidazole (INN)
iproplatin (INN)
iprotiazem (INN)
iproxamine (INN)
iprozilamine (INN)
ipsalazide (INN)
ipsapirone (INN)